The  was a bowed string musical instrument. The  had two silk strings and was held vertically.

Origin and development
The  is believed to have been developed by the Kumo Xi, a Mongol- or Khitan-related ethnic group living in the Xar Moron River valley in northeast China.

The  first appeared in China during the Tang Dynasty (618–907 CE), during which time it was used in the palace orchestra and bowed with a bamboo stick. It was further developed in the Song Dynasty (960–1279), when it began to be bowed with a horsehair bow.

In 1105, during the Northern Song Dynasty, the instrument was described as a foreign, two-stringed fiddle in an encyclopedic work on music called  (literally "book of music") by the music theorist Chen Yang.

Similar instruments

See also

References

Chinese musical instruments
Huqin family instruments
Necked bowl lutes
Continuous pitch instruments
Wuhuan